Üzdənoba (also, Uzdenoba) is a village and municipality in the Qusar Rayon of Azerbaijan.  It has a population of 614.  The municipality consists of the villages of Üzdənoba and Salahoba.

References 

Populated places in Qusar District